The Cishan Wude Hall is a former martial arts training center in Qishan District, Kaohsiung, Taiwan. It was built in 1934 after being proposed by the Japanese "in the spirit of Bushido". The hall was constructed in a traditional Japanese-style temple with strong Tang Dynasty-style temples style.

See also
 List of tourist attractions in Taiwan

References

External links

 

1934 establishments in Taiwan
Buildings and structures in Kaohsiung
Martial art halls in Taiwan
Sports venues completed in 1934